The Eighth Texas Legislature met from November 7, 1859 to April 9, 1861 in its regular session, a first called session, and an adjourned session. All members of the House of Representatives and about half of the members of the Senate were elected in 1859.

Sessions
 8th Regular session: November 7, 1859 – February 13, 1860
 8th First called session: January 21–February 9, 1861
 8th Adjourned session: March 18–April 9, 1861

Party summary

Officers

Senate
 Lieutenant Governor Edward Clark, Democrat
 President pro tempore Jesse Grimes, Democrat, Regular session

House of Representatives
 Speaker of the House  M. D. K. Taylor, Democrat

Members
Members of the Eighth Texas Legislature at the beginning of the regular session, November 7, 1859:

Senate

House of Representatives

 Basilio Benavides
 Anthony Martin Branch
 Kindallis Bryan 
 Constantine W. Buckley
 William Clark
 David B. Culberson
 Nicholas Henry Darnell
 John Wilson Davis, Jr.
 Isaac N. Dennis
 David Catchings Dickson
 Edward Dougherty
 Foscue
 James Carlton Francis
 Benjamin Cromwell Franklin
 De Witt Clinton Fort
 Lindsay Hagler, San Patricio County
 James Marshall Harrison
 J. W. Henderson
 Alfred Marmaduke Hobby
 Richard Bennett Hubbard, Jr.
 Henry Lawrence Kinney
 Francis J. Lynch
 John Haywood Manley
 Samuel Maverick
 John N. McClarty
 George McKnight
 Roger Q. Mills
 William Wright Morris
 Titus H. Mundine
 José Ángel Navarro
 Allison Nelson
 Benjamin F. Parker
 Samuel Redgate
 Joel Walter Robison
 Shelton
 Daniel McDowell Short
 John Dennis Stell
 M. D. K. Taylor
 Robert H. Taylor
 Robert J. Townes
 Jacob Waelder
 Charles A. Warfield
 George Washington Whitmore
 William Amos Wortham
 Friedrich Wilhelm von Wrede, Jr.

Membership changes

Senate

  District 15: Sexton did not return from Confederate States Army service in time to meet with the legislature.
  District 25: Shelley elected in special election held March 25, 1861 and sworn in with the Ninth Texas Legislature.

House of Representatives

External links

08 Texas Legislature
1859 in Texas
1860s in Texas
1860 in Texas
1859 U.S. legislative sessions
1860 U.S. legislative sessions